Dewi Tia Safitri (born 15 March 1998) is an Indonesian footballer who plays a forward for Arema Putri and the Indonesia women's national team.

Club career
Tia has played for Arema Putri in Indonesia.

International career 
Tia represented Indonesia at the 2022 AFC Women's Asian Cup qualification.

International goals

Honours

Club
Arema
 Pertiwi Cup 3rd place: 2021–22

Individual
 Pertiwi Cup top scorer: 2021–22

References

External links

1998 births
Living people
People from Bantul Regency
Sportspeople from Special Region of Yogyakarta
Indonesian women's footballers
Women's association football forwards
Indonesia women's international footballers